Peripsocidae is a family of Psocodea (formerly Psocoptera) belonging to the suborder Psocomorpha. Members of the family are characterised by their absence of an areola postica in their wings. Many of the recently described genera are closely allied to Peripsocus. The family includes more than 300 species.

Genera
These 12 genera belong to the family Peripsocidae:

 Bicuspidatus c g
 Campanulatus c g
 Coniperipsocus c g
 Cycloperipsocus c g
 Diplopsocus c g
 Kaestneriella Roesler, 1943 i c g b
 Orbiperipsocus c g
 Pericupsocus c g
 Peripsocus Hagen, 1866 i c g b
 Periterminalis c g
 Properipsocus c g
 Turriperipsocus c g

Data sources: i = ITIS, c = Catalogue of Life, g = GBIF, b = Bugguide.net

Sources 

 Lienhard, C. & Smithers, C. N. 2002. Psocoptera (Insecta): World Catalogue and Bibliography. Instrumenta Biodiversitatis, vol. 5. Muséum d'histoire naturelle, Genève.

Further reading

 
 
 

 
Psocoptera families